Meleh Kabud or Melah Kabud may refer to:
Meleh Kabud, Dalahu, Kermanshah Province
Melah Kabud, Salas-e Babajani, Kermanshah Province
Meleh Kabud, Sarpol-e Zahab, Kermanshah Province
Meleh Kabud-e Olya, Lorestan Province
Meleh Kabud-e Sofla, Lorestan Province